Raúl Norberto Pérez (born Rosario 2 July 1965) is a Argentine rugby union former player and coach of the Argentine Super Rugby side, the . He is currently the head coach of Paraguay national rugby union team (Los Yakares). He played as a flanker. He worked as a systems analyst and programmer.

He played for Duendes Rugby Club his entire career, from 1983/84 to 1999/2000.

Pérez had 21 caps for Argentina, from 1992 to 1999, scoring 1 try, 5 points in aggregate. He was selected for the 1999 Rugby World Cup but never played.

Coaching
After finishing his playing days, he became the coach of Duendes, from 2001/02 to 2004/05. He later also would be the coach of the Rosario Rugby Union U-23 team, from 2005 to 2007, of Argentina U-21, from 2007 to 2008, and since 2009, he is one of the two coaches of the Argentina A. From 2013, he has been the assistant coach for the National senior side under head coach Daniel Hourcade.
By July 2018, Pérez become Paraguay Head coach.

External links
Profile of Raúl Pérez

1965 births
Living people
Argentine rugby union players
Argentine rugby union coaches
Rugby union flankers
Argentina international rugby union players
Sportspeople from Rosario, Santa Fe